The 1980 Tour of the Basque Country was the 20th edition of the Tour of the Basque Country cycle race and was held from 7 April to 11 April 1980. The race was won by Alberto Fernández of the Teka team.

General classification

References

1980
Bas